Shri Ram Janmabhoomi Teerth Kshetra is a trust set up for the construction and management of Ram Mandir in Ayodhya by the government of India in February 2020. The trust is composed of 15 trustees.

Background 
It was created as per the verdict of the Supreme Court on the M Siddiq(D) Thr Lrs v/s Mahant Suresh Das & Ors case. The court directed the central government to set up a trust to oversee and manage the construction of the temple within three months of the judgement. Prime Minister Narendra Modi announced the formation of the trust in the Lok Sabha on 5 February 2020.

The trust was awarded the disputed 2.77 acre land as well as the 67.703 acre land acquired under the Acquisition of Certain Area at Ayodhya Act, 1993 following the Supreme Court verdict in this regard.

The central government nominated the 12 of 15 members of the trust. Kesava Parasaran, the former Attorney General who represented Shri Ram Lalla Virajmaan in the Ayodhya case, was made the acting chairman. On 19 February 2020, the trust nominated the rest of its members and elected Mahant Nrityagopal Das as the chairman.

The senior trustees had signed an agreement with C.B. Sompura in 1992 for architecture design services was revalidated with additional provisions. In November 2020, the trust appointed Larsen & Toubro as the design & build contractor and Tata Consulting Engineers as the project manager consultant for the construction of the temple. In February 2020, further contracts were signed with Tata Consulting Engineers and Design Associates Inc. for the development of the 67 acre temple complex.

Composition of trustees 
The trust will have 15 members, of which 9 are permanent and 6 are nominated members with each member must be a practicing Hindu.

Permanent members:

 K. Parasaran: represented Shri Ram Lalla Virajmaan
 Four religious leaders from various temples across India
 A representative from the Nirmohi Akhara
 Two prominent civilians from Ayodhya district
 A dalit representative

Nominated members:

 Two prominent persons to be elected by the trust through majority resolution to be part of the trust
 One representative to be nominated by the central government, who will be an IAS officer, at least of joint secretary level
 One representative to be nominated by the state government and would be an IAS officer under the state government
 District Magistrate of  Ayodhya will be the ex-officio trustee (If serving DM is not a Hindu then the additional magistrate will sit on the board)
 The chairman of the construction committee of Ram Mandir complex will also be selected by the trust board and will be an ex-officio trustee

The temple trust set-up by the government was initially headed by Parasaran was tasked to nominate the remaining three members. On 19 February 2020, the first meeting of trust held at the residence of Parasaran, elected Ram Janmabhoomi Nyas' chief, Mahant Nrityagopal Das Ji Maharaj as the Chairman and VHP vice-president, Champat Rai as the General Secretary. Both of them were elected unanimously to the trust. Former IAS officer and Principal Secretary, Nripendra Mishra was nominated as the Chairman of the construction committee. Currently, Swami Govind Dev Giri Ji Maharaj  is the Treasurer and K. Parasaran is the Senior Spokesperson of the trust.

Of 15, only 11 trustees have voting rights. The two officers appointed by the state and central government, district collector of Ayodhya and the representative of Nirmohi Akhara will not have any voting rights in the proceedings of the trust.

List of chairpersons

See also
Ram Janmabhoomi Nyas

References

External links 

Ayodhya dispute
2020 establishments in Delhi
Religious organizations established in 2020
Organisations based in Uttar Pradesh